Arumuganeri is a panchayat town at Tiruchendur constituency from Thoothukudi district  in the state of Tamil Nadu, India.In ancient times, the town was part of the Kuda Nadu division headed by Korkai.

Geography 
 It has an average elevation of 30 metres (100 feet).

Population 
 India census, The Arumuganeri Town Panchayat has population of 27,266 of which 13,368 are males while 13,898 are females as per report released by Census India 2011.

Transport  
The nearest port is V. O. Chidambaranar Port Trust Tuticorin Port.

By Air
The nearest domestic airport is Tuticorin Airport which is around 30 km from Arumuganeri. The nearest International Airport is Madurai Airport which is 170 km from it.

By Rail
Arumuganeri Railway station lies in the Tirunelveli-Tiruchendur line. Chendur Express is the only express train connecting Arumuganeri with Chennai. There are six passenger trains in which two between Tiruchendur and Tirunelveli, two between Tiruchendur and Thoothukudi and two between Tiruchendur and Palani.

By Road
There are regular buses to nearby towns and cities. There are many Government and private buses to many parts of the state.

Gallery

References 

Cities and towns in Thoothukudi district